An anti-ballistic missile (ABM) is a surface-to-air missile designed to counter ballistic missiles (missile defense). Ballistic missiles are used to deliver nuclear, chemical, biological, or conventional warheads in a ballistic flight trajectory. The term "anti-ballistic missile" is a generic term conveying a system designed to intercept and destroy any type of ballistic threat; however, it is commonly used for systems specifically designed to counter intercontinental ballistic missiles (ICBMs).

Current counter-ICBM systems

There are a limited number of systems worldwide that can intercept intercontinental ballistic missiles:

 The Russian A-135 anti-ballistic missile system (renamed in 2017 to A-235) is used for the defense of Moscow. It became operational in 1995 and was preceded by the A-35 anti-ballistic missile system. The system uses Gorgon and Gazelle missiles previously armed with nuclear warheads. These missiles have been updated (2017) and use non-nuclear kinetic interceptors instead, to intercept any incoming ICBMs.
 The Israeli Arrow 3 system entered operational service in 2017. It is designed for exo-atmosphere interception of ballistic missiles during the spaceflight portion of their trajectory, including those of ICBMs. It may also act as an anti-satellite weapon.
 The Indian Prithvi Defence Vehicle Mark 2 has the capability to shoot down ICBMs. It has completed developmental trials and is awaiting the Indian government's clearance in order to be deployed.
 The American Ground-Based Midcourse Defense (GMD) system, formerly known as National Missile Defense (NMD), was first tested in 1997 and had its first successful intercept test in 1999. Instead of using an explosive charge, it launches a hit-to-kill kinetic projectile to intercept an ICBM. The current GMD system is intended to shield the United States mainland against a limited nuclear attack by a rogue state such as North Korea. GMD does not have the ability to protect against an all-out nuclear attack from Russia, as there are 44 ground-based interceptors deployed in 2019 against any crossing projectiles headed toward the homeland. (This interceptor count does not include the THAAD, or Aegis, or Patriot defenses against directly incoming projectiles.)
 The Aegis ballistic missile defense-equipped SM-3 Block II-A missile demonstrated it can shoot down an ICBM target on 16 Nov 2020.
In November 2020, the US launched a surrogate ICBM from Kwajalein Atoll toward Hawaii in the general direction of the continental US, which triggered a satellite warning to a Colorado Air Force base. In response,  launched a missile which destroyed the surrogate ICBM, while still outside the atmosphere.

American plans for Central European site

During 1993, a symposium was held by western European nations to discuss potential future ballistic missile defence programs. In the end, the council recommended deployment of early warning and surveillance systems as well as regionally controlled defence systems.
During spring 2006 reports about negotiations between the United States and Poland as well as the Czech Republic were published.
The plans propose the installation of a latest generation ABM system with a radar site in the Czech Republic and the launch site in Poland. The system was announced to be aimed against ICBMs from Iran and North Korea. This caused harsh comments by Russian President Vladimir Putin at the Organization for Security and Co-operation in Europe (OSCE) security conference during spring 2007 in Munich. Other European ministers commented that any change of strategic weapons should be negotiated on NATO level and not 'unilaterally' [sic, actually bilaterally] between the U.S. and other states (although most strategic arms reduction treaties were between the Soviet Union and U.S., not NATO). The German foreign minister Frank-Walter Steinmeier, a Social Democrat, expressed severe concerns about the way in which the U.S. had conveyed its plans to its European partners and criticised the U.S. administration for not having consulted Russia prior to announcing its endeavours to deploy a new missile defence system in Central Europe. According to a July 2007 survey, a majority of Poles were opposed to hosting a component of the system in Poland.
By 28 July 2016 Missile Defense Agency planning and agreements had clarified enough to give more details about the Aegis Ashore sites in Romania (2014) and Poland (2018).

Current tactical systems

People's Republic of China

Historical Project 640 
Project 640 had been the PRC's indigenous effort to develop ABM capability. The Academy of Anti-Ballistic Missile & Anti-Satellite was established from 1969 for the purpose of developing Project 640. The project was to involve at least three elements, including the necessary sensors and guidance/command systems, the Fan Ji (FJ) missile interceptor, and the XianFeng missile-intercepting cannon. The FJ-1 had completed two successful flight tests during 1979, while the low-altitude interceptor FJ-2 completed some successful flight tests using scaled prototypes. A high altitude FJ-3 interceptor was also proposed. Despite the development of missiles, the programme was slowed down due to financial and political reasons. It was finally closed down during 1980 under a new leadership of Deng Xiaoping as it was seemingly deemed unnecessary after the 1972 Anti-Ballistic Missile Treaty between the Soviet Union and the United States and the closure of the US Safeguard ABM system.

Operational Chinese system 
In March 2006, China tested an interceptor system comparable to the U.S. Patriot missiles.

China has acquired and is license-producing the S-300PMU-2/S-300PMU-1 series of terminal ABM-capable SAMs. China-produced HQ-9 SAM system may possess terminal ABM capabilities. PRC Navy's operating modern air-defense destroyers known as the Type 052C Destroyer and Type 051C Destroyer are armed with naval HHQ-9 missiles.

The HQ-19, similar to the THAAD, was first tested in 2003, and subsequently a few more times, including in November 2015. The HQ-29, a counterpart to the MIM-104F PAC-3, was first tested in 2011.

Surface-to-air missiles that supposedly have some terminal ABM capability (as opposed to midcourse capability):
 HQ-29
 HQ-19
 HQ-18
 HQ-15

Development of midcourse ABM in China 
The technology and experience from the successful anti-satellite test using a ground-launched interceptor during January 2007 was immediately applied to current ABM efforts and development.

China carried out a land-based anti-ballistic missile test on 11 January 2010. The test was exoatmospheric and done in midcourse phase and with a kinetic kill vehicle. China is the second country after US that demonstrated intercepting ballistic missile with a kinetic kill vehicle, the interceptor missile was a SC-19. The sources suggest the system is not operationally deployed as of 2010.

On 27 January 2013, China did another anti ballistic missile test. According to the Chinese Defence Ministry, the missile launch is defensive in character and is not aimed against any countries. Experts hailed China's technological breakthrough because it is difficult to intercept ballistic missiles that have reached the highest point and speed in the middle of their course. Only two countries, including the US, have successfully conducted such a test in the past decade.

On 4 February 2021, China successfully conducted mid-course intercept anti-ballistic missile test. Military analysts indicates that the test and dozens done before reflects China's improvement in the area.

Rumored midcourse missiles:
 DN-3
 DN-2
 DN-1
 HQ-26

France and Italy

The Aster is a family of missiles jointly developed by France and Italy. The Aster 30 variants are capable of ballistic missile defense. An export customer, the United Kingdom also operates the Aster 30 Block 0. 

On 18 October 2010, France announced a successful tactical ABM test of the Aster 30 missile and on 1 December 2011 a successful interception of a Black Sparrow ballistic target missile. The s in French and Italian service, the Royal Navy's Type 45 destroyers, and the French and Italian FREMM-class frigates are all armed with PAAMS (or variants of it) integrating Aster 15 and Aster 30 missiles. It will incorporate a kill vehicle warhead.

India

India has an active ABM development effort using indigenously developed and integrated radars, and indigenous missiles. In November 2006, India successfully conducted the PADE (Prithvi Air Defence Exercise) in which an anti-ballistic missile, called the Prithvi Air Defence (PAD), an exo-atmospheric (outside the atmosphere) interceptor system, intercepted a Prithvi-II ballistic missile. During the test, the target missile was intercepted at a  altitude. India became the fourth nation in the world after United States, Russia, and Israel to acquire such a capability and the third nation to acquire it using in-house research and development. On 6 December 2007, the Advanced Air Defence (AAD) missile system was tested successfully. First reported in 2009, the Defence Research and Development Organisation (DRDO) is developing a new Prithvi interceptor missile code-named PDV. The PDV is designed to take out the target missile at altitudes above . The first PDV was successfully test fired on 27 April 2014. According to scientist V K Saraswat of the DRDO, the missiles will work in tandem to ensure a hit probability of 99.8 percent. On 15 May 2016, India successfully launched AAD renamed Ashwin from Abdul Kalam Island off the coast of Odisha.
As of 8 January 2020, the BMD programme has been completed and the Indian Air Force and the DRDO are awaiting government's final approval before the system is deployed to protect New Delhi and then Mumbai. After these two cities, it will be deployed in other major cities and regions. India has structured a five-layer missile shield for Delhi as of 9 June 2019:

PAD and PDV are designed for mid-course interception, while AAD is for terminal phase interception.
Outermost BMD layer at endo- and exo-atmospheric altitudes (15–25 km, and 80–100 km) for 2000 km ranges 
XRSAM and S-400 layer at ranges of 40, 120, 200, 250, 350 & 400 km
Barak-8 layer at ranges of 70–100 km
Akash, Akash-NG layer at ranges of 30–35 km
Surface to air missiles and gun systems as the inner-most ring of defense. Previously planned to acquire NASAMS-II. But Indian Air Force deterred by high cost is now looking at domestic alternative (potentially land-based VL-SRSAM).

The current Phase-1 of the Indian ABM system can intercept ballistic missiles of range up to 2,000 km and the Phase-2 will increase it up to 5,000 km.

Israel

Arrow 2

The Arrow project was begun after the U.S. and Israel agreed to co-fund it on 6 May 1986.

The Arrow ABM system was designed and constructed in Israel with financial support by the United States by a multibillion-dollar development program called "Minhelet Homa" (Wall Administration) with the participation of companies like Israel Military Industries, Tadiran and Israel Aerospace Industries.

During 1998 the Israeli military conducted a successful test of their Arrow missile. Designed to intercept incoming missiles travelling at up to 2-mile/s (3 km/s), the Arrow is expected to perform much better than the Patriot did in the Gulf War. On 29 July 2004 Israel and the United States carried out a joint experiment in the US, in which the Arrow was launched against a real Scud missile. The experiment was a success, as the Arrow destroyed the Scud with a direct hit. During December 2005 the system was deployed successfully in a test against a replicated Shahab-3 missile. This feat was repeated on 11 February 2007.

Arrow 3 

The Arrow 3 system is capable of exo-atmosphere interception of ballistic missiles, including of ICBMs. It also acts as an anti-satellite weapon.

Lieutenant General Patrick J. O'Reilly, Director of the US Missile Defense Agency, said: "The design of Arrow 3 promises to be an extremely capable system, more advanced than what we have ever attempted in the U.S. with our programs."

On 10 December 2015 Arrow 3 scored its first intercept in a complex test designed to validate how the system can detect, identify, track and then discriminate real from decoy targets delivered into space by an improved Silver Sparrow target missile. According to officials, the milestone test paves the way toward low-rate initial production of the Arrow 3.

David’s sling

David's Sling (Hebrew: קלע דוד), also sometimes called Magic Wand (Hebrew: שרביט קסמים), is an Israel Defense Forces military system being jointly developed by the Israeli defense contractor Rafael Advanced Defense Systems and the American defense contractor Raytheon, designed to intercept tactical ballistic missiles, as well as medium- to long-range rockets and slower-flying cruise missiles, such as those possessed by Hezbollah, fired at ranges from 40 km to 300 km. It is designed with the aim of intercepting the newest generation of tactical ballistic missiles, such as Iskander.

Japan 

Since 1998, when North Korea launched a Taepodong-1 missile over northern Japan, the Japanese have been jointly developing a new surface-to-air interceptor known as the Patriot Advanced Capability 3 (PAC-3) with the US. Tests have been successful, and there are 11 locations that are planned for the PAC-3 to be installed. The approximate locations are near major air bases, like Kadena Air Base, and ammunition storage centers of the Japanese military. The exact location are not known to the public.  A military spokesman said that tests had been done on two sites, one of them a business park in central Tokyo, and Ichigaya – a site not far from the Imperial Palace.
Along with the PAC-3, Japan has installed a US-developed ship-based anti-ballistic missile system, which was tested successfully on 18 December 2007. Japan has 4 destroyers of this type capable of carrying RIM-161 Standard Missile 3 and equipped with the Aegis Ballistic Missile Defense System. Japan is currently modifying another 4 destroyers so that they can take part of their defense force against ballistic missiles, bringing the total number to 8 ships.

Soviet Union/Russian Federation

The Moscow ABM defense system was designed with the aim of being able to intercept the ICBM warheads aimed at Moscow and other important industrial regions, and is based on:
 A-35 Aldan
 ABM-1 Galosh / 5V61 (decommissioned)
 A-35M
 ABM-1B (decommissioned)
 A-135 Amur
 ABM-3 Gazelle / 53T6
 ABM-4 Gorgon / 51T6 (decommissioned)
 A–235 Nudol (In development)

Apart from the main Moscow deployment, Russia has striven actively for intrinsic ABM capabilities of its SAM systems.
 S-300P (SA-10)
 S-300V/V4 (SA-12)
 S-300PMU-1/2 (SA-20)
 S-400 (SA-21)
 S-500 Prometey (serial production began in 2021)

United States

In several tests, the U.S. military have demonstrated the feasibility of destroying long and short range ballistic missiles. Combat effectiveness of newer systems against 1950s tactical ballistic missiles seems very high, as the MIM-104 Patriot (PAC-1 and PAC-2) had a 100% success rate in Operation Iraqi Freedom.

The U.S. Navy Aegis Ballistic Missile Defense System (Aegis BMD) uses RIM-161 Standard Missile 3, which hit a target going faster than ICBM warheads. On 16 November 2020 an SM-3 Block IIA interceptor successfully destroyed an ICBM in mid-course, under Link-16 Command and Control, Battle Management, and Communications (C2BMC).

The U.S. Army Terminal High Altitude Area Defense (THAAD) system began production in 2008. Its stated range as a short to intermediate ballistic missile interceptor means that it is not designed to hit midcourse ICBMs, which can reach terminal phase speeds of mach 8 or greater. The THAAD interceptor has a reported maximum speed of mach 8, and THAAD has repeatedly proven it can intercept descending exoatmospheric missiles in a ballistic trajectory.

The U.S. Army Ground-Based Midcourse Defense (GMD) system was developed by the Missile Defense Agency. It combines ground-based AN/FPS-132 Upgraded Early Warning Radar installations and mobile AN/TPY-2 X-band radars with 44 exoatmospheric interceptors stationed in underground silos around California and Alaska, to protect against low-count ICBM attacks from rogue states. Each Ground-Based Interceptor (GBI) rocket carries an Exoatmospheric Kill Vehicle (EKV) kinetic kill interceptor, with 97% probability of intercept when four interceptors are launched at the target.

Since 2004, the United States Army plans to replace Raytheon's Patriot missile (SAM) engagement control station (ECS), along with seven other forms of ABM defense command systems, with Integrated Air and Missile Defense Battle Command System (IBCS) designed to shoot down short, medium, and intermediate range ballistic missiles in their terminal phase by intercepting with a hit-to-kill approach. 
Northrop Grumman was selected as the prime contractor in 2010; the Army spent $2.7 billion on the program between 2009 and 2020. IBCS engagement stations will support identification and tracking of targets using sensor fusion from disparate data streams, and selection of appropriate kill vehicles from available launcher systems.   
In February 2022 THAAD radar and TFCC (THAAD Fire Control & Communication) demonstrated their interoperability with Patriot PAC-3 MSE missile launchers, engaging targets using both THAAD and Patriot interceptors.

Kestrel eye is a cubesat swarm designed to produce a picture of a designated ground target, and to relay the picture to the ground Warfighter every 10 minutes.

Republic of China

Procurement of MIM-104 Patriot and indigenous Tien-Kung anti-ballistic missile systems. With the tense situations with China, Taiwan developed the Sky Bow (or Tien-Kung), this surface-to-air missile can intercept and destroy enemy aircraft and ballistic missiles. These system was created in partnership with Raytheon Technologies, using Lockheed Martin ADAR-HP as inspiration to create the Chang Bai S-band radar system. The missiles have a range of 200km and was designed to take on fast moving vehicles with low radar cross-section.  The latest variant of this system is the Sky Bow III (TK-3).

South Korea 
Since North Korea started developing its nuclear weapon program, South Korea has been under imminent danger. South Korea started its BDM program by acquiring 8 batteries of the MIM-104 Patriot (PAC-2) missiles from the United States. The PAC-2 was developed to destroy incoming aircraft and is now unreliable in defending a ballistic missile attack from North Korea, as they have developed further their nuclear program. As of 2018, South Korea decided to improve its defense system by upgrading to the PAC-3, which has a hit-to-kill capability against incoming missiles.  The main reason that the South Korean anti-ballistic defense system is not very developed is because they have tried to developed their own, without help from other countries, since the beginning of the 1990's. The South Korean Defense Acquisition Program Administration (DAPA) has confirmed that it has test launched the L-SAM system on February of 2022. This particular missile has been in development since 2019 and is South Korea's next anti-ballistic missile generation. It is expected to have a range of 150 km and be able to intercept targets between 40 km and 100 km of altitude, and it can also be used as an aircraft interceptor. The L-SAM system is expected to be complete and ready to use in 2024.

History

1940s and 1950s

The idea of destroying rockets before they can hit their target dates from the first use of modern missiles in warfare, the German V-1 and V-2 program of World War II.

British fighters destroyed some V-1 "buzz bombs" in flight, although concentrated barrages of heavy anti-aircraft artillery had greater success. Under the lend-lease program, 200 US 90 mm AA guns with SCR-584 radars and Western Electric/Bell Labs computers were sent to the UK. These demonstrated a 95% success rate against V-1s that flew into their range.

The V-2, the first true ballistic missile, has no known record of being destroyed in the air. SCR-584's could be used to plot the trajectories of the missiles and provide some warning, but were more useful in backtracking their ballistic trajectory and determining the rough launch locations. The Allies launched Operation Crossbow to find and destroy V-2s before launch, but these operations were largely ineffective. In one instance a Spitfire happened upon a V-2 rising through the trees, and fired on it with no effect. This led to allied efforts to capture launching sites in Belgium and the Netherlands.

A wartime study by Bell Labs into the task of shooting down ballistic missiles in flight concluded it was not possible. In order to intercept a missile, one needs to be able to steer the attack onto the missile before it hits. A V-2's speed would require guns of effectively instantaneous reaction time, or some sort of weapon with ranges on the order of dozens of miles, neither of which appeared possible. This was, however, just before the emergence of high-speed computing systems. By the mid-1950s, things had changed considerably, and many forces worldwide were considering ABM systems.

The American armed forces began experimenting with anti-missile missiles soon after World War II, as the extent of German research into rocketry became clear. Project Wizard began in 1946, with the aim of creating a missile capable of intercepting the V-2.

But defences against Soviet long-range bombers took priority until 1957, when the Soviet Union demonstrated its advances in ICBM technology with the launch of Sputnik, the Earth's first artificial satellite. The US Army accelerated development of their LIM-49 Nike Zeus system in response. Zeus was criticized throughout its development program, especially from those within the US Air Force and nuclear weapons establishments who suggested it would be much simpler to build more nuclear warheads and guarantee mutually assured destruction. Zeus was eventually cancelled in 1963.

In 1958, the U.S. sought to explore whether airbursting nuclear weapons might be used to ward off ICBMs. It conducted several test explosions of low-yield nuclear weapons – 1.7kt boosted fission W25 warheads – launched from ships to very high altitudes over the southern Atlantic Ocean. Such an explosion releases a burst of X-rays in the Earth's atmosphere, causing secondary showers of charged particles over an area hundreds of miles across. These can become trapped in the Earth' magnetic field, creating an artificial radiation belt. It was believed that this might be strong enough to damage warheads traveling through the layer. This proved not to be the case, but Argus returned key data about a related effect, the nuclear electromagnetic pulse (NEMP).

Canada
Other countries were also involved in early ABM research. A more advanced project was at CARDE in Canada, which researched the main problems of ABM systems. A key problem with any radar system is that the signal is in the form of a cone, which spreads with distance from the transmitter. For long-distance interceptions like ABM systems, the inherent inaccuracy of the radar makes an interception difficult. CARDE considered using a terminal guidance system to address the accuracy concerns, and developed several advanced infrared detectors for this role. They also studied a number of missile airframe designs, a new and much more powerful solid rocket fuel, and numerous systems for testing it all. After a series of drastic budget reductions during the late 1950s the research ended. One offshoot of the project was Gerald Bull's system for inexpensive high-speed testing, consisting of missile airframes shot from a sabot round, which would later be the basis of Project HARP. Another was the CRV7 and Black Brant rockets, which used the new solid rocket fuel.

Soviet Union

The Soviet military had requested funding for ABM research as early as 1953, but were only given the go-ahead to begin deployment of such a system on 17 August 1956. Their test system, known simply as System A, was based on the V-1000 missile, which was similar to the early US efforts. The first successful test interception was carried out on 24 November 1960, and the first with a live warhead on 4 March 1961. In this test, a dummy warhead was released by a R-12 ballistic missile launched from the Kapustin Yar, and intercepted by a V-1000 launched from Sary-Shagan.

The V-1000 missile system was nonetheless considered not reliable enough and abandoned in favour of nuclear-armed ABMs. A much larger missile, the Fakel 5V61 (known in the west as Galosh), was developed to carry the larger warhead and carry it much further from the launch site. Further development continued, and the A-35 anti-ballistic missile system, designed to protect Moscow, became operational in 1971. A-35 was designed for exoatmospheric interceptions, and would have been highly susceptible to a well-arranged attack using multiple warheads and radar black-out techniques.

A-35 was upgraded during the 1980s to a two-layer system, the A-135. The Gorgon (SH-11/ABM-4) long-range missile was designed to handle intercepts outside the atmosphere, and the Gazelle (SH-08/ABM-3) short-range missile endoatmospheric intercepts that eluded Gorgon. The A-135 system is considered to be technologically equivalent to the United States Safeguard system of 1975.

American Nike-X and Sentinel
Nike Zeus failed to be a credible defence in an era of rapidly increasing ICBM counts due to its ability to attack only one target at a time. Additionally, significant concerns about its ability to successfully intercept warheads in the presence of high-altitude nuclear explosions, including its own, lead to the conclusion that the system would simply be too costly for the very low amount of protection it could provide.

By the time it was cancelled in 1963, potential upgrades had been explored for some time. Among these were radars capable of scanning much greater volumes of space and able to track many warheads and launch several missiles at once. These, however, did not address the problems identified with radar blackouts caused by high-altitude explosions. To address this need, a new missile with extreme performance was designed to attack incoming warheads at much lower altitudes, as low as 20 km. The new project encompassing all of these upgrades was launched as Nike-X.

The main missile was LIM-49 Spartan—a Nike Zeus upgraded for longer range and a much larger 5 megaton warhead intended to destroy enemy's warheads with a burst of x-rays outside the atmosphere. A second shorter-range missile called Sprint with very high acceleration was added to handle warheads that evaded longer-ranged Spartan. Sprint was a very fast missile (some sources claimed it accelerated to 8,000 mph (13 000 km/h) within 4 seconds of flight—an average acceleration of 90 g) and had a smaller W66 enhanced radiation warhead in the 1–3 kiloton range for in-atmosphere interceptions.

The experimental success of Nike X persuaded the Lyndon B. Johnson administration to propose a thin ABM defense, that could provide almost complete coverage of the United States. In a September 1967 speech, Defense Secretary Robert McNamara referred to it as "Sentinel". McNamara, a private ABM opponent because of cost and feasibility (see cost-exchange ratio), claimed that Sentinel would be directed not against the Soviet Union's missiles (since the USSR had more than enough missiles to overwhelm any American defense), but rather against the potential nuclear threat of the People's Republic of China.

In the meantime, a public debate over the merit of ABMs began. Difficulties that had already made an ABM system questionable for defending against an all-out attack. One problem was the Fractional Orbital Bombardment System (FOBS) that would give little warning to the defense. Another problem was high altitude EMP (whether from offensive or defensive nuclear warheads) which could degrade defensive radar systems.

When this proved infeasible for economic reasons, a much smaller deployment using the same systems was proposed, namely Safeguard (described later).

Defense against MIRVs

ABM systems were developed initially to counter single warheads launched from large intercontinental ballistic missiles (ICBMs). The economics seemed simple enough; since rocket costs increase rapidly with size, the price of the ICBM launching a large warhead should always be greater than the much smaller interceptor missile needed to destroy it. In an arms race the defense would always win.

In practice, the price of the interceptor missile was considerable, due to its sophistication. The system had to be guided all the way to an interception, which demanded guidance and control systems that worked within and outside the atmosphere. Due to their relatively short ranges, an ABM missile would be needed to counter an ICBM wherever it might be aimed. That implies that dozens of interceptors are needed for every ICBM since warhead's targets couldn't be known in advance.  This led to intense debates about the "cost-exchange ratio" between interceptors and warheads.

Conditions changed dramatically in 1970 with the introduction of multiple independently targetable reentry vehicle (MIRV) warheads. Suddenly, each launcher was throwing not one warhead, but several. These would spread out in space, ensuring that a single interceptor would be needed for each warhead. This simply added to the need to have several interceptors for each warhead in order to provide geographical coverage. Now it was clear that an ABM system would always be many times more expensive than the ICBMs they defended against.

Anti-Ballistic Missile Treaty of 1972

Technical, economic and political problems described resulted in the ABM treaty of 1972, which restricted the deployment of strategic (not tactical) anti-ballistic missiles.

By the ABM treaty and a 1974 revision, each country was allowed to deploy a mere 100 ABMs to protect a single, small area. The Soviets retained their Moscow defences. The U.S. designated their ICBM sites near Grand Forks Air Force Base, North Dakota, where Safeguard was already under advanced development. The radar systems and anti-ballistic missiles were approximately 90 miles north/northwest of Grand Forks AFB, near Concrete, North Dakota. The missiles were deactivated in 1975. The main radar site (PARCS) is still used as an early warning ICBM radar, facing relative north. It is located at Cavalier Air Force Station, North Dakota.

Brief use of Safeguard in 1975/1976
The U.S. Safeguard system, which utilized the nuclear-tipped LIM-49A Spartan and Sprint missiles, in the short operational period of 1975/1976, was the second counter-ICBMs system in the world. Safeguard protected only the main fields of US ICBMs from attack, theoretically ensuring that an attack could be responded to with a US launch, enforcing the mutually assured destruction principle.

SDI experiments in the 1980s

The Reagan-era Strategic Defense Initiative (often referred to as "Star Wars"), along with research into various energy-beam weaponry, brought new interest in the area of ABM technologies.

SDI was an extremely ambitious program to provide a total shield against a massive Soviet ICBM attack. The initial concept envisioned large sophisticated orbiting laser battle stations, space-based relay mirrors, and nuclear-pumped X-ray laser satellites. Later research indicated that some planned technologies such as X-ray lasers were not feasible with then-current technology. As research continued, SDI evolved through various concepts as designers struggled with the difficulty of such a large complex defense system. SDI remained a research program and was never deployed. Several post-SDI technologies are used by the present Missile Defense Agency (MDA).

Lasers originally developed for the SDI plan are in use for astronomical observations. Used to ionize gas in the upper atmosphere, they provide telescope operators with a target to calibrate their instruments.

Tactical ABMs deployed in 1990s
The Israeli Arrow missile system was tested initially during 1990, before the first Gulf War. The Arrow was supported by the United States throughout the 1990s.

The Patriot was the first deployed tactical ABM system, although it was not designed from the outset for that task and consequently had limitations. It was used during the 1991 Gulf War to attempt to intercept Iraqi Scud missiles. Post-war analyses show that the Patriot was much less effective than initially thought because of its radar and control system's inability to discriminate warheads from other objects when the Scud missiles broke up during reentry.

Testing ABM technology continued during the 1990s with mixed success. After the Gulf War, improvements were made to several U.S. air defense systems. A new Patriot, PAC-3, was developed and tested—a complete redesign of the PAC-2 deployed during the war, including a totally new missile. The improved guidance, radar and missile performance improves the probability of kill over the earlier PAC-2. During Operation Iraqi Freedom, Patriot batteries engaged 100% of enemy TBM's within their engagement territory. Of these engagements, 8 of them were verified as kills by multiple independent sensors; the remaining was listed as a probable kill due to lack of independent verification. Patriot was involved in three friendly fire incidents: two incidents of Patriot shootings at coalition aircraft and one of U.S. aircraft shooting at a Patriot battery.

A new version of the Hawk missile was tested during the early to mid-1990s and by the end of 1998 the majority of US Marine Corps Hawk systems were modified to support basic theater anti-ballistic missile capabilities. The MIM-23 Hawk missile is not operational in U.S. service since 2002, but is used by many other countries.

Soon after the Gulf War, the Aegis Combat System was expanded to include ABM capabilities. The Standard missile system was also enhanced and tested for ballistic missile interception. During the late 1990s, SM-2 block IVA missiles were tested in a theater ballistic missile defense function. Standard Missile 3 (SM-3) systems have also been tested for an ABM role.

Brilliant Pebbles concept
Approved for acquisition by the Pentagon during 1991 but never realized, Brilliant Pebbles was a proposed space-based anti-ballistic system that was meant to avoid some of the problems of the earlier SDI concepts. Rather than use sophisticated large laser battle stations and nuclear-pumped X-ray laser satellites, Brilliant Pebbles consisted of a thousand very small, intelligent orbiting satellites with kinetic warheads. The system relied on improvements of computer technology, avoided problems with overly centralized command and control and risky, expensive development of large, complicated space defense satellites.
It promised to be much less expensive to develop and have less technical development risk.

The name Brilliant Pebbles comes from the small size of the satellite interceptors and great computational power enabling more autonomous targeting. Rather than rely exclusively on ground-based control, the many small interceptors would cooperatively communicate among themselves and target a large swarm of ICBM warheads in space or in the late boost phase. Development was discontinued later in favor of a limited ground-based defense.

Transformation of SDI into MDA, development of NMD/GMD
While the Reagan era Strategic Defense Initiative was intended to shield against a massive Soviet attack, during the early 1990s, President George H. W. Bush called for a more limited version using rocket-launched interceptors based on the ground at a single site. Such system was developed since 1992, was expected to become operational in 2010 and capable of intercepting small number of incoming ICBMs. First called the National Missile Defense (NMD), since 2002 it was renamed Ground-Based Midcourse Defense (GMD). It was planned to protect all 50 states from a rogue missile attack. The Alaska site provides more protection against North Korean missiles or accidental launches from Russia or China, but is likely less effective against missiles launched from the Middle East. The Alaska interceptors may be augmented later by the naval Aegis Ballistic Missile Defense System or by ground-based missiles in other locations.

During 1998, Defense Secretary William Cohen proposed spending an additional $6.6 billion on intercontinental ballistic missile defense programs to build a system to protect against attacks from North Korea or accidental launches from Russia or China.

In terms of organization, during 1993 SDI was reorganized as the Ballistic Missile Defense Organization. In 2002, it was renamed to Missile Defense Agency (MDA).

21st century
On 13 June 2002, the United States withdrew from the Anti-Ballistic Missile Treaty and recommenced developing missile defense systems that would have formerly been prohibited by the bilateral treaty. The action was stated as needed to defend against the possibility of a missile attack conducted by a rogue state. The next day, the Russian Federation dropped the START II agreement, intended to completely ban MIRVs.

The Lisbon Summit of 2010 saw the adoption of a NATO program that was formed in response to the threat of a rapid increase of ballistic missiles from potentially unfriendly regimes, though no specific region, state, or country was formally mentioned. This adoption came from the recognition of territorial missile defense as a core alliance objective. At this time, Iran was seen as the likely aggressor that eventually led to the adoption of this ABM system, as Iran has the largest missile arsenal of the Middle East, as well as a space program. From this summit, NATO's ABM system was potentially seen as a threat by Russia, who felt that their ability to retaliate any perceived nuclear threats would be degraded. To combat this, Russia proposed that any ABM system enacted by NATO must be universal to operate, cover the entirety of the European continent, and not upset any nuclear parity. The United States actively sought NATO involvement in the creation of an ABM system, and saw an Iranian threat as a sufficient reason to warrant its creation. The United States also had plans to create missile defense facilities, but NATO officials feared that it would have provided protection to Europe, it would have detracted from the responsibility of NATO for collective defense. The officials also argued the potential prospect of U.S-commanded operation system that would work in conjunction with the Article 5 defense of NATO.

On 15 December 2016, the US Army SMDC had a successful test of a U.S. Army Zombie Pathfinder rocket, to be used as a target for exercising various anti-ballistic missile scenarios. The rocket was launched as part of NASA's sounding rocket program, at White Sands Missile Range.

In November 2020, the US successfully destroyed a dummy ICBM. The ship launched a SM-3 Block IIA missile to destroy the US dummy, still outside the atmosphere.

See also
 2010 Chinese anti-ballistic missile test
 Aegis Ballistic Missile Defense System
 Atmospheric entry
 Command systems in the United States Army
 Indian Ballistic Missile Defence Programme
 Kinetic kill vehicle
 Missile defense
 Anti-torpedo torpedoes
 Multiple Kill Vehicle
 National Missile Defense
 Nuclear disarmament
 Nuclear proliferation
 Nuclear warfare
 Safeguard/Sentinel ABM system
 Spartan (missile)
 Sprint (missile)
 Terminal High Altitude Area Defense

Notes

Citations

General sources 
 Murdock, Clark A. (1974), Defense Policy Formation: A Comparative Analysis of the McNamara Era. SUNY Press.

Further reading
 Laura Grego and David Wright, "Broken Shield:  Missiles designed to destroy incoming nuclear warheads fail frequently in tests and could increase global risk of mass destruction", Scientific American, vol. 320, no. no. 6 (June 2019), pp. 62–67.  "Current U.S. missile defense plans are being driven largely by technology, politics and fear.  Missile defenses will not allow us to escape our vulnerability to nuclear weapons.  Instead large-scale developments will create barriers to taking real steps toward reducing nuclear risks—by blocking further cuts in nuclear arsenals and potentially spurring new deployments."  (p. 67.)

External links

Article on Missile Threat Shift to the Black Sea region
Video of the Endo-Atmospheric Interceptor missile system test by India 
Video of the Exo-Atmospheric interceptor missile system test by India
Center for Defense Information
Federation of American Scientists
MissileThreat.com
Stanley R. Mickelson Safeguard complex
History of U.S. Air Defense Systems

 
Missile defense
Missile types
Russian inventions
Surface-to-air missiles